Sergey Andreyevich Afanasyev (born 25 March 1988) is a Russian racing driver, holder of honour "Master of sports of Russia".

Education

School 
Sergey graduated from school (Moscow) in 2004 with the gold medal.

Higher education 
2009 – Academic Law University (Russian Academy of Science) // Law (Honours degree)

2010 – Lomonosov Moscow State University // Marketing

2013 – Moscow Socio-Pedagogical Institute // Pedagogics and psychology

Career

Early career
Afanasyev began his racing career 1998 in baggy-kart where immediately started to achieve high results. Since 1999 started to take part in go-kart competition.

1999 – bronze in Russian Championship in Mini

2000 – Champion of Russia in Raket

2001 – bronze in Russian Championship in ICA-junior

2002 – Champion of Russia in ICA-junior

2002 – Champion of Russia in Oka-junior (winter track racing)

Formula RUS and Formula Renault 2000
Sergey began his racing career in openwheels in 2003 in the Formula RUS. That year saw him take three wins in this series. The next year he took championship title. He also took part in eight Formula Renault Monza races for BVM Minardi Junior Team, finishing the year in 13th place.

The following year, Afanasyev took part in a full Formula Renault 2.0 season, driving with Lukoil Racing team. He finished tenth overall in that year. He also contested thirteen races of the Eurocup Formula Renault 2.0, hugely crashed at Bilbao and taking a best race result of fourth at Oschersleben to finish twenty-fourth in the standings.

In 2006 Afanasiev moved up to new Formula Renault 2.0 Northern European Cup championship for Lukoil Racing team. He finished eighth overall in that year. He also contested ten races of the Formule Renault 2.0 Suisse championship and finishing as runner-up.

Formula 3 Euro Series
In 2007 Afanasyev made his debut in Formula 3 Euro Series for HBR Motorsport team. Also he contested in Masters of Formula 3 at Zolder, but he did not qualify and missed the race.

International Formula Master
Afanasyev took part in International Formula Master for two years with JD Motorsport team. In first season he won one race and finished eighth overall. He also contested in six Formula Renault 3.5 Series races for the KTR team and failed to score a championship point.

Afanasyev remained in the series for 2009 season and improved to second place overall.

FIA Formula Two Championship
In 2010 Afanasyev graduated to Formula Two, finishing third in the standings with four podium finishes which gave him the right to receive the F1 licence.

Auto GP
Afanasyev switched to Auto GP for 2011, joining team champions DAMS. He was the only who scored three wins, but due to problems with British visa he missed Donington round and finished the season just on third place.

FIA GT1 World Championship
In 2012 Afanasyev and his main sponsor Lukoil decide to leave open-wheels and join FIA GT1 World Championship with Valmon Racing Team Russia in Aston Martin. His partner that year was Andreas Zuber.

GT racing 
In the end of 2012 Sergey together with Bernd Schneider finished 4th in the Baku City Challenge.

In 2013 together with HTP Gravity Charouz team on Mercedes SLS AMG GT3 joined by Andreas Simonsen won the Championship.

Next year Andreas left the championship and Sergey was joined by Stef Dusseldorp.

Touring Car Racing 
Together with Lukoil Sergey moved to the front wheel driving cars and in 2015–2016 took part in the new championship – TCR International Series achieving podiums and the pole-position.

Lamborghini Super Trofeo 
In 2017 Afanasyev and Lukoil made a mutual decision to terminate the interaction. Sergey drove two years with ArtLine racing team in the European and Middle East championships in ProAm category achieving the best result as the runner-up.

Lamborghini Super Trofeo championship was selected by Jonnesway tools as the General sponsor of Afanasiev, due to the good price-to-performance ratio.

Sergey joined the Bonaldi team in 2019 joined by Danny Kroes in the car. Together they won the Chempionship. The best results were achieved in Zandvoort (hometrack of Danny), where they won both races in front of the Dutch fans.

Coming back to GT racing 
In November 2019 Afanasyev joined the Black Falcon racing team for the Kyalami 9 Hours race which was the part of the International GT Challenge. His partners were Patrick Assenheimer and Hubert Haupt in silver class. Leading most part of the race, but after an accident in heavy rain they finished second.

Next race was – Bathurst 12 Hours. Haupt was not able to join so he was replaced by Michele Beretta. Leading until the last 4 hours of the race. Issues with the car after a small contact with the wall pushed them back. Third position at the finish is still a good result for the rookies of the one of the most incredible circuits in the world.

Racing record

Career results

Complete Formula 3 Euro Series results
(key) (Races in bold indicate pole position) (Races in italics indicate fastest lap)

Complete Formula Renault 3.5 Series results
(key) (Races in bold indicate pole position) (Races in italics indicate fastest lap)

Complete FIA Formula Two Championship results
(key) (Races in bold indicate pole position) (Races in italics indicate fastest lap)

Complete Auto GP results
(key) (Races in bold indicate pole position) (Races in italics indicate fastest lap)

FIA GT competition results

GT1 World Championship results

FIA GT Series results

Complete TCR International Series results
(key) (Races in bold indicate pole position) (Races in italics indicate fastest lap)

† Driver did not finish the race, but was classified as he completed over 75% of the race distance.

References

External links
Profile on Instagram
Official site
Career statistics from Driver Database
Profile on Lukoil Racing Team
Profile on Formula Two Championship
Profile on IFM site

1988 births
Living people
Russian racing drivers
Italian Formula Renault 1.6 drivers
German Formula Renault 2.0 drivers
Formula Renault 2.0 Alps drivers
Formula Renault 2.0 NEC drivers
Formula Renault Eurocup drivers
Formula 3 Euro Series drivers
International Formula Master drivers
FIA Formula Two Championship drivers
World Series Formula V8 3.5 drivers
Auto GP drivers
FIA GT1 World Championship drivers
Blancpain Endurance Series drivers
ADAC GT Masters drivers
24 Hours of Spa drivers
Sportspeople from Moscow
TCR International Series drivers
DAMS drivers
JD Motorsport drivers
KTR drivers
BVM Racing drivers
Charouz Racing System drivers
Craft-Bamboo Racing drivers
Lamborghini Super Trofeo drivers